Communities and Residents (C&R) is a right-leaning local body ticket in Auckland, New Zealand. It was formed in 1938 as Citizens & Ratepayers, with a view to controlling the Auckland City Council and preventing left-leaning Labour Party control. It controlled the council most of the time from World War II until the council was merged into the Auckland Council in 2010. It changed its name from "Citizens & Ratepayers" to "Communities and Residents" in 2012.

History

The Citizens & Ratepayers Association was formed in 1938. It was formed with the intention to "secure the return of the best possible types of candidate to the Auckland City Council, Harbour Board, Hospital Board and Electric Power Board". It also intended to "preserve local government in all its then present forms, protecting it from any influence and interference of party politics".

During the period 1938–1998, the Auckland City Council was under the control of C&R except for three years from 1953 to 1956. C&R people were involved in the sanitation and drainage infrastructure for Auckland and the Auckland Harbour Bridge (driven in particular by C&R councillor, then Mayor, Sir John Allum). Other notable events include management of the city during World War II, construction of Auckland International Airport, and construction of the Civic Administration building.

In more recent years, C&R constructed the Aotea Centre, brought in updated by-laws, and commenced a number of cultural initiatives, including construction of a new central library, extensive renovation of the Auckland City Art Gallery in the mid-1980s, and reaching around 300 parks and reserves within the Auckland City limits. Cultural and community centres were also constructed at a rapid pace.

In 1989, amalgamation of the various council boroughs around Auckland saw the potential for some significant upheaval to the management of Auckland City. However, this was overseen with relatively little angst, in the words of Graham Bush, Auckland City Historian. C&R enjoyed almost constant control of the Auckland City in the second half of the 20th century. C&R did not always stand mayoral candidates, sometimes preferring to concentrate on the council organisation, but has given tacit and low key approval short of endorsement to some mayoral candidates.

During the 1990s, Citizens and Ratepayers came under some criticism for being seen as inflexible and out of touch with voters. Many of the C&R councillors had served for many years and there was a perception that it was lacking in fresh faces. Public discontent over issues like Metrowater, waste removal, the Britomart Transport Centre and proposed property developments alongside it saw sustained criticism of Auckland's political management.

1998–2010
For the 1998 election, former C&R members formed a new ticket with a view to bringing the "old" C&R organisation back to its more fiscally prudent and centre-right roots. This new organisation, Auckland NOW, won only two council seats, but its contesting of the election across the city split the centre-right vote and ended C&R control of the city.

After the 1998 election, a rapprochement between Citizens and Ratepayers and Auckland Now occurred, with an agreement to contest the 2001 elections together under the brand "Auckland Citizens & Ratepayers Now". This merged organisation was successful in winning back the council, simultaneously with the election of the independent socially conservative centre-right mayor John Banks.

However, at the 2004 election, a backlash occurred against C&R Now in some wards, seeing control of the city go to the left-wing City Vision ticket, as well as the election of a new mayor, Dick Hubbard.

During the 2004–2007 term, a new constitution for C&R was proposed, with the effect that many in Auckland NOW joined C&R, and the organisations were effectively merged to contest the 2007 election. C&R gained significantly in the 2007 elections, capturing a majority on the Auckland City Council, in addition to the re-election of John Banks.

2010–present
In the 2010 elections, the first for the new Auckland Council, C&R won just five seats on the twenty-seat council and John Banks was well beaten in the mayoral election by Manukau City mayor Len Brown.

In 2012 Citizens & Ratepayers adopted the name Communities & Residents, following a review of the organisation's performance in the 2010 council elections. Other changes adopted after the review included abandoning the "whipping" system used in voting on council issues.

The team leader for Communities and Residents is former Auckland City Mayor Christine Fletcher. The previous leader and former deputy mayor of Auckland City was David Hay. Jami-Lee Ross, a councillor for Howick, was co-leader alongside Fletcher from 2010 until March 2011, when he was elected to Parliament in a by-election and resigned from the council.

In the 2022 Auckland local elections, C&R endorsed former Chief Executive of Heart of the City Viv Beck for the Auckland mayoralty, and would succeed in increasing its share of Auckland local board members and Licensing Trustees.

C&R has stood for other bodies in Auckland, including the erstwhile Auckland Regional Council, the Auckland District Health Board (which governs Auckland's main health agency), Entrust (on which it currently holds all seats), and various liquor licensing trusts.

C&R has long been aligned with the National Party, which traditionally does not field its own candidates in Auckland local body elections, unlike the Labour Party and the Green Party.

Electoral results

Auckland local elections

Entrust trustee elections
C&R's record of tenure on Entrust seats for the elections since 2000.

References

External links
 Communities and Residents website

Politics of the Auckland Region
Political groupings in New Zealand
New Zealand National Party